International Development and Relief Foundation (IDRF) is a Canadian non-profit organization dedicated to linking Canadian and Muslim communities with overseas development projects, both humanitarian emergency assistance and long term development projects in Asia, Africa, the Middle East, Eastern Europe, and the Americas, based on Islamic principles of human dignity, self-reliance, and social justice.

Since 1984, IDRF has been supporting those affected by wars and natural disasters; aiding regions of our worlds affected by grave poverty, injustice, illiteracy, and preventable diseases; and securing long-term sustainability for disadvantaged people around the world.

IDRF focuses on two types of projects:

A) Participatory Development Programs -aid regions of the world affected by poverty, illiteracy, injustice, and preventable diseases. IDRF helps disadvantaged individuals access primary education, basic health care and sanitation, clean water, and modest opportunities for income generation. These programs help people at the grassroots level to organize themselves to work collectively for their own social and economic improvement.

B) Relief and Rehabilitation Programs -provide immediate assistance and rehabilitation services to those affected by natural and man made disasters by providing victims with basic necessities such as food, clothing, shelter, trauma counseling, and medical assistance.

Brief history

IDRF began in 1984 as the International Refugee and Relief Program (IRRP) of the Canadian Council of Muslim Communities (CMCC) to address the need of more than ten million people who were displaced around the globe as a result of war and famine. Approximately, 80 per cent of these international displaced persons (IDPs) were Muslim.

The organization was founded by three concerned Canadians: Dr. Fuad Sahin, the late Muin Muinuddin and Ebrahim Sayed. In 2008, Dr. Fuad Sahin was honored with the Order of Ontario, recognizing his service to the community.

On June 12, 1986, IRRP was incorporated as the International Development and Relief Foundation (IDRF), in order to address the root causes of poverty, famine, and violent conflicts at the international level. Including "Development" in the name of IDRF would change the direction and mission of the organization. IDRF transformed itself from being solely an emergency humanitarian agency into an organization that concentrates on helping people at the community level, both in the immediate aftermath of natural and man made disasters as well as in the process of long-term development to alleviate poverty, illiteracy, injustice, and preventable diseases.

In 2009, IDRF celebrated a 25-year milestone. Over its 25-year history, IDRF has implemented development and relief projects in over 27 countries and/or territories and has helped millions of impoverished and tormented men, women and children.

Project partners

IDRF partners with local experts, International NGOs and grassroots organizations to increase effectiveness while keeping projects costs down. By partnering with grassroots organizations, IDRF can meet the needs of the local communities and its beneficiaries. The following is a list of IDRF Canadian and Overseas partners, as of January 2009:

Canadian Partners:

American Federation of Muslims of Indian Origin (AFMI);
Canadian Auto Workers Association (CAW);
Canadian Feed The Children (CFTC);
Canadian International Development Agency (CIDA);
Canadian International Peace Project (CIPP);
Canadian Muslim Relief Council (CMRC);
Children of Hope (COH);
Children of Islamic Nation (COIN);
Development In Literacy (DIL);
Harbinger Foundation;
Hope International;
Islamic Centre of Southwestern Ontario;
Islamic Society of Toronto (IST);
Islamic Society of York Region (ISYR);
Malamulele Onward;
Ontario Provincial Government;
Sarnia Muslim Association;
SOS Children's Villages (SOS)-Canada;
The Citizens Foundation (TCF) - Canada;

Overseas Implementing Partners:

Action for Relief and Development Assistance (AFREDA) - Tanzania;
Al-Islam Foundation - Sri Lanka;
Al-Shifa Trust Eye Hospital - Pakistan;
Anjuman-e-Saifee – Tanzania;
Azhar-al-Bekaa – Lebanon;
Bangladesh Women Chamber of Commerce and Industry (BWCCI) - Banlgladesh;
Bihar Viklang Kalyan Parishad (BVKP) – India;
BOMU Medical Center (BOMU) – Kenya;
Canadian Feed the Children (CFTC) - Canada;
Central Islamic Organization of Guyana (CIOG) – Guyana;
Community Coordination Initiative (CCI) – India;
Culture and Free Thought Association (CFTA) - Palestine;
DOW Medical Clinic – Pakistan;
Developments in Literacy (DIL)-Pakistan;
El-Wafa Medical Rehabilitation Hospital - Palestine;
Hamilo Relief and Development Association (HIRDA) – Somalia;
Hope International (Myanmar) - Burma;
Hussaini Foundation - Pakistan;
Islamic Relief Worldwide – UK;
International Organisation for Migration (IOM) - Iraq;
Kalanga Bazar Educational Trust (KBET) – India;
Layton Rahmatulla Benevolent Trust (LRBT) – Pakistan;
Malamulele Onward (MO) – South Africa;
Mercy Association for Children (Mabarra) - Palestine;
Modern Educational Social and Cultural Organization (MESCO) – India;
National Committee of Sisters Affairs (NACOSA) - Guyana;
Palestinian Counseling Center (PCC) - Palestine;
Partners in Revitalization and Building (PRB) – Afghanistan;
Reach The Youth – Uganda (Reach);
Response International - Lebanon;
Rural Support Programmes Network (RSPN) - Pakistan;
Rural Women's Development Society (RWDS) - Palestine;
Sanati Orphanage - Iran;
Sarhad Rural Support Programme (SRSP) - Pakistan;
Sarvajanik Medical Trust (SMT) - India;
Shaukat Khanum Memorial Trust - Pakistan;
Sindh Institute of Urology and Transplantation (SIUT) – Pakistan;
SOS Children's Villages (SOS)-Pakistan;
South African Neurodevelopmental Therapy Association (SANDTA) - South Africa;
South Asia Partnership (SAP) - Pakistan;
Subh-e-nau - Pakistan;
Takhleeq Foundation - Pakistan;
The Citizens Foundation (TCF) – Pakistan;
The Young Advocates for the Advancement of ICT-related Development (YAAICT-D) -Malawi;
Uganda Community Based Association for Child Welfare (UCOBAC) Village Education Research Center (VERC) – Bangladesh;
Women and Children Development Organization (WCDO) – Ethiopia;
Zemlja Djece (ZD) - Bosnia and Herzegovina;
Zindagi Trust - Pakistan

CIDA-funded projects

IDRF benefits from the financial support and guidance of Canadian International Development Agency (CIDA). CIDA is Canada's lead agency for development assistance. The following is a list of some IDRF projects which have been supported by CIDA:

Burma - Cyclone Nargis Emergency Relief for Affected Communities 

Sri Lanka - Kalmunai Tsunami Recovery

2006/2008 - Sudan - Assistance to Internally Displaced Persons in Darfur

2007/2008 - Bangladesh - Cyclone SIDR Emergency Relief Programme

2002/2004 - Iraq - Healthcare Provision & Clean Water

2002/2007 - Afghanistan - Sustainable Livelihoods in Drought-Affected Areas

References

Development charities based in Canada